Chaetocarpus castanocarpus is a plant of the family Peraceae. Leaves are simple and alternate. Flower color may vary from greenish yellow to yellow. It is distributed in Myanmar, Cambodia, Indonesia, India, Sri Lanka, Thailand, Andaman Islands, Bangladesh, Vietnam and Laos. Tree trunk is used for construction purposes. Leaves are used as a leafy vegetable.

Culture 
Known as හැඩවක (Hedawaka / Hedoke) in Sinhala by Sinhalese people in Sri Lanka. Leaves and roots are widely used as an Ayurvedic purposes which used for the treatments muscular pains and tendons pains.

References

External links
 castanocarpus  Nationaalherbarium.nl: Chaetocarpus castanocarpus
 Tropical plants: Chaetocarpus castanocarpus

Peraceae
Flora of tropical Asia